The McBride Range is a small mountain range in southwestern British Columbia, Canada, located east of Cheakamus Lake at the northeast side of Garibaldi Provincial Park. It has an area of 228 km2 and is a subrange of the Garibaldi Ranges which in turn form part of the Pacific Ranges of the Coast Mountains.

See also
List of mountain ranges

References

Garibaldi Ranges